Georgia is a hamlet in the parish of Towednack, Cornwall, England.

Georgia lies within the Cornwall Area of Outstanding Natural Beauty (AONB).

References

Hamlets in Cornwall